There are at least 10 members of the birch, alder, and oak order, Fagales found in Montana. Some of these species have been designated as Species of Concern.

Beech and oaks
Family: Fagaceae
Quercus macrocarpa, bur oak

Birch and alder

Family: Betulaceae
Alnus incana, speckled alder
Alnus rubra, red alder
Alnus viridis, green alder
Betula nana, swamp birch
Betula occidentalis, spring birch
Betula papyrifera, paper birch
Betula pumila, bog birch
Betula × sargentii, hybrid birch
Betula × utahensis, hybrid birch

Further reading

See also
 List of dicotyledons of Montana

Notes

Montana
Montana
Fagales